Nikola Lomnická (born 16 September 1988) is a Slovak hammer thrower. She competed in the women's hammer throw at the 2017 World Championships in Athletics.

References

External links

1988 births
Living people
Slovak female hammer throwers
World Athletics Championships athletes for Slovakia
Place of birth missing (living people)